Arthur Gerald Donahue,  (29 January 1913 – 11 September 1942) was an American fighter pilot who volunteered to fly for the British Royal Air Force in World War II. He was one of 11 American pilots who flew with RAF Fighter Command between 10 July and 31 October 1940, thereby qualifying for the Battle of Britain clasp to the 1939–45 campaign star. He was killed in action in September 1942.

Early life
Donahue was born to Frank and Ada Donahue on 29 January 1913 and was raised on a dairy farm near St. Charles, Minnesota. He learned to fly as a teenager at the Conrad Flying Service, operated by Max Conrad, an aviator known as the "Flying Grandfather" who had set numerous world records for distance and endurance. Becoming Minnesota's youngest commercially certificated pilot at the age of 19, Donahue helped Conrad run the flight school until he left to enlist in the Royal Air Force. He traveled to Canada, claimed to be Canadian, and was accepted.

Royal Air Force service
After training with No. 7 Operational Training Unit, Donahue was assigned to No. 64 Squadron at RAF Kenley on 3 August 1940. Two days later, he saw combat against Messerschmitt Bf 109s off the French coast, and suffered serious damage to his aircraft, forcing him to land at RAF Hawkinge. Donahue thus became one of ten Americans to fly for the RAF in the Battle of Britain in 1940.

A week later, on 12 August, Donahue was wounded in combat over England's south coast in his Supermarine Spitfire Mk. I. He was forced to bail out of his burning aircraft, and suffered burns and leg injuries.

On 29 September 1940, Donahue was reassigned to No. 71 Squadron, one of three Eagle Squadrons, RAF units composed of American pilots, but did not see combat with that unit. Because of the lack of action, he requested to be reassigned to No. 64 Squadron, arriving back there on 23 October.

In February 1941, Donahue served with No. 91 Squadron, although in March he went on leave back to the USA. In October 1941 he was posted to No. 258 Squadron in the Far East, and participated in the Battle of Singapore, also seeing action over Sumatra in February 1942, where he was wounded by ground fire. After returning to England in mid-1942, he rejoined No 91 Squadron as a flight commander. He became the first American in RAF history to lead an all-English squadron. He was credited with downing two enemy aircraft, with two more probables and one damaged. He was awarded four medals, including the Distinguished Flying Cross on 27 March 1942. The citation for the award read:

Death
Flight Lieutenant Donahue was killed in action on 11 September 1942, while a member of No. 91 Squadron. Attempting to intercept a Ju 88, his plane was hit by return fire and ditched in the English Channel. His body was never found. Donahue once wrote in a letter to his parents, "My life may not be long, but it will be wide." He is commemorated on the Air Forces Memorial at Runnymede in Surrey, England.

Author
Donahue wrote two books about his RAF service, Tally-Ho! Yankee in a Spitfire and Last Flight from Singapore.

See also

 List of Battle of Britain pilots
 Non-British personnel in the RAF during the Battle of Britain

References

Bibliography
 Donahue, Arthur Gerald. (1944). Last Flight from Singapore. London: Macmillan & Company.
 
 Kershaw, Alex. (2006). The Few. Cambridge, Mass.: Da Capo Press.

External links
Art Donahue at Find a grave
Battle of Britain pilots
4th Fighter Group WWII Official WWII Association Website Referenced 4 March 2012

1913 births
1942 deaths
American World War II flying aces
Aviators from Minnesota
Aviators killed by being shot down
Royal Air Force personnel killed in World War II
People from St. Charles, Minnesota
Military personnel from Minnesota
Recipients of the Distinguished Flying Cross (United Kingdom)
Royal Air Force officers
American Royal Air Force pilots of World War II
The Few
20th-century American memoirists
American military writers
Writers from Minnesota